Seth Henigan (born March 10, 2003) is an American football quarterback for the Memphis Tigers.

Early life and high school career 
Henigan played high school football at Billy Ryan High School in Denton, Texas. He led Denton Ryan to a 39–2 record from 2018 to 2020 and totaled 7,234 passing yards and 79 passing touchdowns with only 14 interceptions.

College career 
As a true freshman in 2021, Henigan won the starting quarterback job at Memphis. He became the first true freshman to start a season opener in the history of the Memphis football program.

In his second collegiate game, he threw for 417 yards and five touchdowns against Arkansas State and was named National Player of the Week. He finished the 2021 regular season with 3,322 passing yards, 25 touchdowns, and eight interceptions.

As a sophomore in 2022, he has tallied 2,782 passing yards through games played on November 12, 2022. He led the Tigers to a victory in the 2022 First Responder Bowl and was named MVP of the game.

Statistics

References

External links
 Memphis Tigers bio

Living people
American football quarterbacks
Memphis Tigers football players
People from Denton, Texas
Players of American football from Texas
2003 births